The 1998–99 Ligue 1 season (then called Division 1) was the 61st since its establishment. FC Girondins de Bordeaux won the French Association Football League with 72 points.

Participating teams

AJ Auxerre
SC Bastia
FC Girondins de Bordeaux
Le Havre AC
RC Lens
FC Lorient
Olympique Lyonnais
Olympique de Marseille
FC Metz
AS Monaco
Montpellier HSC
AS Nancy-Lorraine
FC Nantes Atlantique
Paris Saint-Germain
Stade Rennais
FC Sochaux-Montbéliard
RC Strasbourg
Toulouse FC

League table

Promoted from Ligue 2, who will play in Division 1 season 1999/2000
 AS Saint-Étienne: champion of Ligue 2
 CS Sedan-Ardennes: runners-up
 Troyes AC: third place

Results

Top goalscorers

References

External links
France 1998/99 at Rec.Sport.Soccer Statistics Foundation

Ligue 1 seasons
France
1